The Plaza Suite was a discothèque in Bensonhurst, Brooklyn, New York City.

Building history
The Plaza Suite was located at 2937 86th Street. The building was originally owned by four legitimate businessmen who formed a corporation called "Enjoy Yourself Incorporated" in 1979 and obtained a liquor license. The building is now an elementary academy school called Big Apple Academy.

Buildings and structures in Brooklyn